HSwMS Illern (In), (Swedish for "Polecat") was the fourth Hajen-class submarine of the Swedish Navy.

Construction and career 
HSwMS Illern was launched on 14 November 1957 by Saab Kockums, Karlskrona and commissioned on 31 August 1959.

She was decommissioned in 1980 and later sold for scrap in Odense in 1981.

Gallery

References 

Hajen-class submarines
Ships built in Malmö
1957 ships